Kaynarca, formerly Şeyhler, is a town and district of Sakarya Province in the Marmara region of Turkey. The mayor is Zeynur Özel (AKP).

The nature reserve Acarlar Floodplain Forest is partly located north of Kaynarca.

References

Populated places in Sakarya Province
Districts of Sakarya Province